The 1st Medical Brigade is a medical brigade of the United States Army. It is located at Fort Hood, Texas, providing health care and medical services to the Fort Hood community, and continuing training in its combat support mission.

History

World War I

The 1st Sanitary Train, as originally organized, was composed of two battalions—one motorized and one animal drawn. The companies of the battalions had all been raised well before the start of the war, and were assembled as an organization upon arrival in France. Each battalion was composed of two field hospital companies and two ambulance companies. The first elements of the train—composed of ambulance company 6 (later renumbered 13) and field hospital company 6 (later renumbered 13) began movement to Hoboken, New Jersey, where they embarked for Europe on 14 June 1917, arriving in the port of St. Nazaire on 26 June. On 13 August, field hospital companies 2 and 12 and ambulance companies 2 and 12 landed on 1 and 3 September in Liverpool, England, and later moved to La Harve. On 1 December field hospital company 3 departed Fort Bliss, Texas and ambulance company 3 departed Fort Oglethorpe, Georgia, sailed from Hoboken on 5 December, and arrived at St. Nazaire on 22 December, among the last elements of the 1st Division to arrive in France. The 1st Sanitary Train was assembled, finally, in the Gondrecourt training area, where the division trained for combat operations.

The table of organization for a sanitary train called for a total of 927 officers and men. Each ambulance company had 12 ambulances; the animal drawn companies each had 70 mules to pull their ambulances, as well as 24 riding horses. Each field hospital company could hold 236 patients, although it was authorized no nurses; the animal drawn field hospital companies also had 30 mules and 22 riding horses each. In column, the sanitary train stretched for 1,160 yards—more than half a mile.

Sommerville Sector
Ambulance Company 13 of the 1st Sanitary Train was the only American ambulance company operational in the Sommerville sector and furnished litter bearers for duty in the trenches, evacuating patients to Field Hospital 13 (like the ambulance company, an organic unit of the 1st Sanitary Train) and from it to Base Hospital 18 at Bazoilles-sur-Meuse, and to Camp Hospital 1 at Gondrecourt. It did not establish a dressing station, as patients were moved direct by litters and by vehicles from the battalion aid stations to the field hospital. Because of road conditions near the front, the ambulance company's collecting point was some distance in the rear of the aid stations, so the wounded were carried through the trenches to the battalion aid stations and then back an additional 3 km to the collecting point at Bathelemont.

Field Hospital 13 was the only field hospital established for the 1st Division in the Somerville sector. Half of it, including X-ray and other necessary equipment, was located in a residence and two pavilions at Einville; the other half was in part of a hospital at Dombasle. As the base and camp hospitals to which this hospital was to evacuate were 81 km to the rear by road, patients were retained with the portion of Field Hospital 13 at Einville.

Ansauville Sector

The division surgeon's office, headquarters of the sanitary train, and headquarters of the train's field hospital and ambulance sections were at Menil-la-Tour.
Medical Department personnel established an aid station at each regimental headquarters and battalion aid stations in battalion areas. The most advanced battalion aid stations were located in dugouts at Seicheprey. Because the village was under direct enemy observation and was shelled frequently, patients had to be evacuated at night, when ambulances could travel the road from Beaumont. Evacuation to the regimental aid stations often required that patients be carried a kilometer or more through trenches which often were knee deep in mud and water. Patients were usually suffering from disease, although a moderate number of men suffering from shell wounds, and on occasion a fairly large number of chemical casualties.

Infantry regimental aid stations were first established Beaumont and Mandres, but on 1 March the station Mandres moved to Bouconville. The aid stations at Beaumont and Bouconville were in basements of partially destroyed buildings and were made provided additional protection from indirect fire using logs, sandbags, and stone. The road between Beaumont and Mandres was especially dangerous, as it was shelled day and night, causing many casualties. The regimental aid station of the 16th Infantry at Mandres had at first functioned also as a dressing station, but on 1 March 1918, this service was taken over by Ambulance Company 2, until they, in turn, were relieved by Ambulance Company 3 on 27 March. The station treated chemical casualties as well as other cases and to a limited degree acted as a triage point. It was on the axial road and occupied a building whose walls had been protected by thick sandbags, but occasionally when receiving indirect fire it utilized a dugout which it had constructed nearby.
Ambulance Company 13 operated ambulances from Menil-la-Tour and provided litter bearers to forward units until relieved by Ambulance Company 12 on 21 March 1918. That ambulance company, augmented by vehicles from other companies, maintained headquarters and an ambulance park at Menil-la-Tour, dispatching ambulances to the dressing station at Mandres and to forward units. Other ambulances were attached to unit aid stations at important points in rear areas of the sector.

Evacuation Ambulance Company 1 from the Services of Supply maintained two ambulances at Field Hospital 13 for evacuation to Sebastopol, where twenty ambulances were available for use during periods of heavy casualties.

The different ambulance circuits, in forward and rear areas, were established for dealing with battle casualties, with a third circuit for the routine sick. The front circuit was maintained by Ford ambulances working forward from Mandres and returning to deliver patients to the dressing station there. Pertaining to it were emergency ambulances stationed at Beaumont, Rambucourt, and Bouconville, and at times at Seicheprey, with reserve at Mandres. The advance point to which ambulances could go by daylight was on the Beaumont-Bouconville road paralleling the front line and 2 km from it. At night ambulances could be sent forward to Xivray-Marvoisin and Seicheprey, 1 km from the front line. When circumstances warranted the risk, ambulances stationed at Seicheprey could evacuate from Seicheprey by day, but not as a routine measure. The rear circuit of heavy G. M. C. ambulances began at Mandres, where patients were carried to a fixed evacuation hospital. In order to cut down transportation, patients who could stand the longer trip to Toul or to Sebastopol were sent directly from Mandres and were not required to stop at the triage at Menil-la-Tour. Patients were distributed from Mandres as follows: (1) Seriously wounded and sick who could not stand long ambulance transportation, to Menil-la-Tour; (2) chemical agent casualties to Menil-la-Tour; (3) surgical cases to Sebastopol; (4) and sick and contagious diseases to Toul. A few ambulances for this circuit were maintained at Mandres, with reserve at Menil-la-Tour. At times of expected periods of high casualties, the ambulance park was advanced to Hamonville, and ambulances and trucks were dispatched to Mandres as needed.

In quiet times a routine circuit of ambulances was maintained, daily calls being made at all aid stations within the division area that could be reached for the collection of sick and slightly wounded to be triaged at Menil-la-Tour, allowing placement of ambulances posted at outlying aid stations for emergency use.

Field Hospital 13 became operational on 17 January 1918 at Menil-la-Tour, in barracks taken over from a French field hospital and equipped for the care of 200 patients. This served at first as a divisional hospital and, after hospitals in the rear began functioning as a triage, for the reception of chemical casualties and some ill patients until relieved about 31 March by a field hospital of the 26th Division. The location was poorly suited for a hospital because of its proximity to a large supply dump and railhead subject to indirect fire. Several attacks occurred and missiles impacted within a hundred yards of the hospital, but no artillery fire was ever received.

Patients began to be received immediately after arrival of the 1st Division in the sector. Seven wounded were admitted on 21 January, and sixty-two chemical casualties on the 26th, the first chemical casualties in the division. Of the 674 patients received by Field Hospital 13, 323—nearly half of all patients treated—were due to chemical agents.

Field Hospital 12, after being held in reserve, became operational on 23 January at Sebastopol in large, permanent, stone barracks. It functioned as an evacuation and surgical hospital until relieved on 4 February by Evacuation Hospital 1, which then assumed responsibility for care of the seriously wounded. The field hospital personnel had been previously augmented by details from Ambulance Companies 3 and 13. Field Hospital 12 moved 6 February to a large stone barracks—Caserne la Marche—at Toul, where it established a 400-bed hospital for the divisional sick. Since the barracks were large and readily adapted for use as a hospital, the field hospitals here supplemented their normal equipment with the addition of large quantities of supplies suitable for the proper maintenance of a semi-permanent hospital.
Field Hospital 2 arrived at Toul on 18 February and established an annex to Field Hospital 12 for the care of contagious cases. It operated until 2 April, when the annex was turned over to a hospital of the 26th Division.

Field Hospitals 12 and 13 evacuated by train from Toul to base hospitals in the rear those cases which did not require surgical attention at Evacuation Hospital 1. This continued until about 3 April, when the facilities were turned over to hospitals of the 26th Division. In this sector Field Hospital 13 received 889 patients (not including those triaged directly to other hospitals) and Field Hospitals 12 and 2 received a combined total of 2,482 patients. As Evacuation Hospital 1 received most of the wounded, their patients were primarily those that were ill, and chemical casualties.

The sick rate of the division was three times that for battle casualties. More than two-thirds of those cases were minor, and most of the patients were returned to duty in a short time directly from the field hospitals. The prevailing diseases in the division in the sector were respiratory or intestinal. Sporadic cases of cerebrospinal meningitis, diphtheria, scarlet fever, mumps, and measles occurred, but no epidemic developed. A camp for venereal cases was established southeast of Raulecourt, and patients who were able to do so were put to work as laborers on road construction and similar heavy work.

The medical supply unit of the division, with a large stock, was maintained at Demange-aux-Eaux in the division rear. An advance medical supply depot was operated by Field Hospital 13 at Menil-la-Tour for issue to all organizations in advance areas. An advance subdepot was maintained at the dressing station at Mandres, for the distribution of supplies by ambulance or runners to front-line aid stations.

The 1st Division was relieved 1–3 April 1918, by the 26th Division and proceeded to the neighborhood of Chaumont-en-Vexin, where headquarters were established 8 April. For the next 10 days the division was trained in open warfare, activities consisting chiefly of brigade and division maneuvers. Regiments evacuated the disabled directly into the French hospitals at Gisors.

Cantigny Sector

The offensive launched by the Germans on 21 March 1918 placed the Allies in a desperate situation. The lack of complete cooperation among the Allies on the Western Front had been appreciated, and the question of preparation to meet the crisis had already received attention of the supreme war council. Reserves were not available and on 28 March, the 1st Division was placed at the disposal of the allied high command, starting movement toward the battle front on 17 April. On 25 April it took over the Cantigny sector 4.9 km west of Montdidier, relieving French troops and becoming a part of the French First Army. During the first six weeks that the division remained in this line the sector was very active; the remaining period was active. Battery positions were made untenable by high-explosive and chemical shells. Air raids were frequent and severe.

On 27 May 1918, the Germans attacked Chateau-Thierry, and when the French appreciated how serious and how successful the attack was they began to withdraw both their air squadrons and supporting artillery from the Cantigny sector. On the 28th the 1st Division made the first sustained American offensive of the war and captured the village of Cantigny—a date later chosen by the 1st Medical Regiment as its Organization Day. Because of determined German efforts to retake the salient, losses were greater after the attack than during it. Beauvais, where a Red Cross hospital was located 38.4 km to the rear, suffered very severely. Hospitals were not immune from attack, and operation of the evacuation system, particularly at night, was very difficult.

Montdidier-Noyon

Picardy

Aisne-Marne

Saint-Mihiel

Meuse-Argonne

After the Armistice was signed, the 1st Sanitary train marched with the rest of the 1st Division to the Coblenz Bridgehead as part of the US Third Army, which served as part of the Army of Occupation.

The Inter-War Years

Supporting the Medical Field Service School
In support of the 1929 class of the Officer Basic Course at the Medical Field Service School, the Regiment accompanied the students—all officers—on their field training exercise, this year conducted on the battlefield at Gettysburg. Students worked problems involving terrain exercises, while the 1st Medical Regiment then demonstrated the approved school solution.

By 1930, the regiment was well integrated into the activities of the school. The regiment was maintained at "full peacetime strength," which equated to the regimental headquarters, a service company, a hospital company, a collecting company, a veterinary company, and two ambulance companies—one motorized and one animal drawn. In addition to serving as the demonstration unit for the school, most of the officers and noncommissioned officers who taught there were drawn from the ranks of the regiment, and senior officers in the regiment frequently moved into department directors in the school after completing their time in the regiment. The Medical Equipment Laboratory, charged with studying and developing equipment and transportation for medical department troops and installations frequently turned to the regiment for assistance in testing equipment in the field, particularly for battalion aid stations and equipment used by the medical regiments of the divisions.

The Ohio river floods, 1937
In January and February 1937, the Ohio and Mississippi rivers flooded over 12,700 square miles in twelve states. As part of the Federal response, The 1st Medical Regiment's Company G (Hospital), under the command of Captain Alvin L. Gorby (who would later command the regiment, and who retired as a major general) arrived by train on 30 January. The company included six medical corps officers and 93 enlisted men, with another 21 enlisted and ten ambulances from the regiment's Company E (Motor Ambulance), who were sent to Fort Benjamin Harrison, Indiana to provide support in that area. Inspecting a school building which had been used as an improvised hospital for the prior week by local volunteers, he found it an excellent facility with a modern structure, indoor plumbing, and a cafeteria. Moving his soldiers into rooms on the top floor, he quickly established hospital operations, reorganizing what he found on arrival was an "appalling lack of organization." When the water pressure proved to be inadequate, he had his troops dig latrines on the school grounds and had water for other purposes trucked in.

Once that hospital was up and running, the company assumed responsibility for a typhoid inoculation station, then repaired and reorganized a second school which was being used as a segregated facility for black patients. During the 13 days the company operated in Louisville, they provided more than 5,000 inoculations and provided over 2,000 patient-days of care in the two improvised hospitals they were running. This relief operation would be the Army's last major domestic relief operation before the start of the World War II.

The Last Reunion of the Blue and Grey, 1938

World War II

Supporting NATO
During most of September 1950 the 1st Medical Group participated in a major exercise called "Rainbow." Following spring 1950 a command post exercise named "Shamrock," this exercise saw most of the US medical units in Germany deploy their headquarters elements to the field, as well as sending as many operational elements as could be spared. Although medical play within the Communications Zone was simulated, soldiers role playing as patients were moved between the units in the field in Germany. In all, 40% of all Medical Corps and 20% of all Nurse Corps officers in Germany participated, with most units, according to published reports, rated as "Excellent" in their performance.

The French Communications Zone

Fort Sam Houston
One of the responsibilities of the 1st Medical Group and its subordinate units at Fort Sam Houston, Texas, was to serve as a test-bed for the Medical Equipment Test and Evaluation Division of the United States Army Medical Materiel Agency. Established in 1964 and based at Fort Sam Houston, the test and evaluation division was responsible for testing new medical products and equipment for suitability for the Army's use. Much as they had done at Carlisle Barracks decades earlier, the 1st Medical Group's units at Fort Sam Houston, including a MUST equipped combat support hospital and an air ambulance company, provided a readily available platform for testing equipment under field conditions.

Subordinate units

World War II

1 February 1945

1st Medical Group
183rd Medical Battalion
442nd Medical Company (Collecting)
472nd Medical Company (Ambulance)
626th Medical Company (Clearing)
430th Medical Battalion
462nd Medical Company (Collecting)
488th Medical Company (Ambulance)

1 March 1945

1st Medical Group
183rd Medical Battalion
442nd Medical Company (Collecting)
462nd Medical Company (Collecting)
626th Medical Company (Clearing)
188th Medical Battalion
463rd Medical Company (Collecting)
472nd Medical Company (Ambulance)
430th Medical Battalion
415th Medical Company (Collecting)
488th Medical Company (Ambulance)
489th Medical Company (Ambulance)

23 March 1945

1st Medical Group
20th Field Hospital
188th Medical Battalion
463rd Medical Company (Collecting)
472nd Medical Company (Ambulance)
565th Medical Company (Ambulance)
430th Medical Battalion
462nd Medical Company (Collecting)
488th Medical Company (Ambulance)
489th Medical Company (Ambulance)

1 May 1945

1st Medical Group
48th Field Hospital
183rd Medical Battalion
442nd Medical Company (Collecting)
463rd Medical Company (Collecting)
626th Medical Company (Clearing)
185th Medical Battalion
Ambulance Platoon, 445th Medical Company (Collecting)
627th Medical Company (Clearing)
430th Medical Battalion
95th Medical Battalion (Gas Treatment) (OPCON)
415th Medical Company (Collecting)
462nd Medical Company (Collecting)
481st Medical Company (Collecting)
488th Medical Company (Ambulance)
666th Medical Company (Clearing)

Cold War

Frankfurt, 10 June 1950
1st Medical Group
HHD, 1st Medical Group
9th General Dispensary
548th Medical Company (Clearing) (Separate)
563rd Dental Prosthetic Detachment (Fixed)
564th Dental Prosthetic Detachment (Mobile)
581st Medical Company (Ambulance)

Southwest Asia

Operation Desert Shield

1st Medical Group
41st Combat Support Hospital
46th Combat Support Hospital
47th Combat Support Hospital
34th Medical Battalion
498th Medical Company (Air Ambulance)
36th Medical Detachment (RG)--UH-60 Aircraft
57th Medical Detachment (RG)--UH-60 Aircraft
82nd Medical Detachment (RA)--UH-1 Aircraft
440th Medical Detachment (RE)
85th Medical Battalion
517th Medical Company (Clearing)
547th Medical Company (Clearing)
595th Medical Company (Clearing)
702nd Medical Company (Clearing)
690th Medical Company (Ambulance)

Operation Desert Storm

1st Medical Group
2nd Mobile Army Surgical Hospital
5th Mobile Army Surgical Hospital
755th Medical Detachment (KA)
10th Mobile Army Surgical Hospital
28th Combat Support Hospital
250th Medical Detachment (KB)
41st Combat Support Hospital
46th Combat Support Hospital
47th Combat Support Hospital
34th Medical Battalion
498th Medical Company (Air Ambulance)
690th Medical Company (Ambulance)
36th Medical Detachment (RG)--UH-60 Aircraft
57th Medical Detachment (RG)--UH-60 Aircraft
82nd Medical Detachment (RA)--UH-1 Aircraft
374th Medical Detachment (RA)--UH-1 Aircraft
85th Medical Battalion
517th Medical Company (Clearing)
547th Medical Company (Clearing)
595th Medical Company (Clearing)
702nd Medical Company (Clearing)
685th Medical Company (Ambulance)
440th Medical Detachment (RE)
274th Medical Detachment (KA)
248th Medical Detachment (JA)
628th Medical Detachment (OM)

Current

Units of the 1st Medical Brigade:

Headquarters Company Fort Hood, Texas
9th Hospital Center Fort Hood, Texas
11th Field Hospital
151st Medical Detachment
198th Medical Detachment
756th Medical Detachment
499th H&N
36th FRSD
43rd VET 
85th CSC 
126th FRSD
555th FRSD
32nd Hospital Center Fort Polk, Louisiana
115th Field Hospital (United States)
485th PM
528th Hospital Center Fort Bliss, Texas
131st Field Hospital
440th BS 
507th OPT 
745 FS
61st Multifunctional Medical Battalion HHD Fort Hood, Texas
176th OPT 
224th PM 
554th OPT 
932nd BS 
546th AS 
566th AS 
581st AS 
582nd MLC
583rd MLC
627th Hospital Center Fort Carson, Colorado
10th Field Hospital
501st AS 
2nd FST 
221st OPT 
223rd PM 
418th MLC 
438th VET
502nd DCAS

Former Commanders

Lineage

Constituted 3 August 1917 in the Regular Army as Headquarters, 1st Sanitary Train, assigned to the 1st Expeditionary Division and organized at New York, New York. (1st Expeditionary Division redesignated 6 July 1918 as 1st Division.)

Redesignated 10 February 1921 as Headquarters, 1st Medical Regiment.

Relieved from the 1st Division, consolidated with Service Company, 1st Medical Regiment (organized during June 1925 at Carlisle Barracks, Pennsylvania by consolidation of Headquarters Detachment, Medical Laboratory Section, and Medical Supply Section, 1st Medical Regiment.

Reorganized and redesignated 8 October 1939 as Headquarters, Headquarters and Service Company, 1st Medical Regiment (Corps).

Redesignated 16 December 1940 Headquarters, Headquarters and Service Company, 1st Medical Regiment (Army).

Reorganized and redesignated 1 September 1943 as Headquarters and Headquarters Detachment, 1st Medical Group.

Inactivated 12 November 1945 in Fort Benning, Georgia

Activated 10 June 1950 in Frankfurt, Federal Republic of Germany

Inactivated 24 March 1962 in Verdun, France.

Activated 3 January 1968 at Fort Sam Houston, Texas.

Reorganized and redesignated 6 June 2000 as Headquarters and Headquarters Company, 1st Medical Brigade

Honors

Campaign participation credit
World War I:
 Lorraine 
 Montdidier-Noyon 
 Picardy 
 Aisne-Marne 
 Saint-Mihiel 
 Meuse-Argonne

World War II:
 Rhineland
 Central Europe

Southwest Asia:
 Defense of Saudi Arabia;
 Liberation and Defense of Kuwait

Decorations

Meritorious Unit Commendation:
 Southwest Asia 1990–1991
 Southwest Asia 2003
 Southwest Asia 2006
 Southwest Asia 2010
 Afghanistan 2012

Insignia

Shoulder sleeve insignia

Description/Blazon

On a white rectangle arced at top and bottom with a 1/8 inch (.32 cm) yellow border, 2 inches (5.08 cm) in width and 3 inches (7.62 cm) in height overall, a maroon cross throughout bearing a yellow rod entwined by a green snake with a red eye.

Symbolism

Maroon and white are the colors used by the Army Medical Department units; gold is for excellence. The staff of Aesculapius and the maroon cross, symbolize the medical arts and allude to the mission of the Brigade.

Background

The shoulder sleeve insignia was authorized effective 6 June 2000. (TIOH Dwg. No. A-1-844)

Distinctive unit insignia

Description/Blazon

A maroon shield bearing within a wreath of silver oak leaves the helmet of an esquire charged with the shoulder sleeve insignia of the First Division, a shield with the figure "1." All above a silver scroll bearing the inscription "FORTITUDE AND COMPASSION" in black letters.

Symbolism

Maroon and white (silver) are the colors used for the Army Medical Service. The red numeral "1" on an olive drab shield is the shoulder sleeve insignia of the 1st Division as authorized 31 October 1918, and with which the unit served in World War I. The helmet indicates the military character of the organization.

Background

The distinctive unit insignia was originally approved for the 1st Medical Regiment on 19 December 1923.
It was redesignated and amended to include a motto for the 1st Medical Group on 20 March 1968. 
The insignia was amended to correct the symbolism on 26 April 1968.
It was redesignated for the 1st Medical Brigade effective 6 June 2000.

References

Sources

External links
Official website http://www.hood.army.mil/1stMed/S3.aspx 
From the Roer to the Elbe with the 1st Medical Group: Medical Support of the Deliberate River Crossing http://history.amedd.army.mil/booksdocs/wwii/fromroertoelbe/default.htm

1
1
1
1
1917 establishments in New York (state)
Medical units and formations of the United States Army